Fred Crowthers was an English-born architect who worked in Charleston, West Virginia for several years in the early-1920s before permanently establishing his business in Detroit, Michigan.  A number of the structures he designed in Charleston are listed on the National Register of Historic Places.

Selected works
 1922 – Briarwood (Charleston, West Virginia) – listed on the National Register of Historic Places in 1984
 1923 – Barnes-Wellford House, Charleston, West Virginia – listed on the National Register of Historic Places in 1984

References 

20th-century American architects
Architects from Charleston, West Virginia
Architects from Detroit
English emigrants to the United States